The Board of Commissioners of Pilots of The State Of New York is the New York state agency responsible for licensing and regulating pilots within one of the largest harbors in the world. It licenses and regulates up to 75 pilots of the Sandy Hook Pilots. They are called "Sandy Hook pilots" because they maneuver ships across a large and dangerous sand bar along the coast of New Jersey at the southern entrance of Lower New York Bay south of New York City. 

The Board of Commissioners is a public agency, created in 1853 during the first session of the New York State Legislature, Chapter 467, Laws of 1853, to provide the selection, training, and regulation of New York pilots.

Jurisdiction
The commission's jurisdiction includes all of the bays and ports in the New York Bay area, and pilotage districts are:
 New Jersey District 
  Hudson River District
 Long Island Sound/Block Island Sound District

In 2018, there were 75 Sandy Hook pilots serving the port of New York and New Jersey. The Hudson River Pilots Association has five full Branch Pilots and five Sandy Hook Pilots for the lower Hudson River. The Northeast Marine Pilots have seven full Branch Pilots.

Commissioners
The commission has eight members appointed by the governor of New York as follows.
 Commissioner and President
 Five Commissioners
 Executive Director (Secretary)
 Office Administrator

History

In 1845, an unofficial Pilot Commission was established with two representatives from the Marine Underwriters and three from the Chamber of Commerce. Pilot boats working under the Underwriters' Commission took on licensed pilots that proved to be more insurable because of their strict rules and regulations. On June 26, 1845, George W. Blunt was appointed to the Board of Pilot Commissioners and became Secretary of the Board. Blunt helped to organized the pilot service for the New York Harbor. He was re-elected by the Chamber of Commerce to the New York Board of Pilot Commissioners from 1868-1870. By 1873, Blunt was President of the Board of Pilot Commissioners.

On June 30, 1853, the New York Legislature passed a Pilot bill that created the Board of Commissioners of Pilots. Today the board is called the Board of Commissioners of Pilots of the State of New York.

In 1893, the model of the pilot-boat Alexander M. Lawrence, No. 4, was exhibited by the Pilot Commissioners of New York at the  1893 Chicago World's Fair along with oil paintings illustrating the perils of the pilot service.

See also
 
California Board of Pilot Commissioners

References

External links 
 
 
 Northeast Marine Pilots Association website

State agencies of New York (state) 
Government agencies established in 1853